Zuid-Afrikaans Hospital is a private, non-profit hospital in Muckleneuk, Pretoria, South Africa, where the working language is both English and Afrikaans.

Notable awards 
Zuid-Afrikaans Hospital was voted one of the top 20 hospitals in South Africa by Discovery Health in their annual hospital survey for 2017, 2016 as well as 2014.

References

External links

Afrikaner culture in Pretoria
Hospitals in Gauteng
Hospitals established in 1904
Buildings and structures in Pretoria